The name Opal has been used for twelve tropical cyclones worldwideone in the Atlantic Ocean (after which it was replaced by the name Olga) and eleven in the Western Pacific Ocean.

In the Atlantic:
 Hurricane Opal (1995), a Category 4 hurricane that caused severe and extensive damage along the northern Gulf Coast of the United States

In the Western Pacific:
 Typhoon Opal (1945), struck Japan
 Typhoon Opal (1946), struck the Philippines
 Typhoon Opal (1955) (T5526), struck Japan
 Tropical Storm Opal (1959) (27W)
 Typhoon Opal (1962) (T6210, 48W), struck Taiwan, China, Korea and Japan (ja)
 Super Typhoon Opal (Naning) (1964) (T6434, 51W), struck the Philippines
 Typhoon Opal (1967) (T6722, 25W)
 Tropical Storm Opal (1970) (T7024, 26W)
 Typhoon Opal (1973) (T7316, 18W)
 Tropical Storm Opal (1976) (T7625, 26W)
 Typhoon Opal (Kuring) (1997) (T9707, 08W), struck Japan

Atlantic hurricane set index articles
Pacific typhoon set index articles